, simply known as , is Japanese tarento from Tokyo, Japan. She sings backing vocals for Gorie.

Discography

Singles 
 [2004.09.08] Mickey (September 8, 2004)
 [2005.09.14] Pecori♥Night (September 14, 2005)
 [2006.09.10]  (September 10, 2006)

Filmography

TV shows 
  (NHK, April 2002 - March 2003)
 MAX (NHK, April 2003 - March 2005)
 One Night R&R (Fuji TV)

Video games 
 Shenmue II (2001, voice for English version)

External links 
 Official homepage
 

Living people
Japanese child actresses
Japanese people of American descent
Japanese voice actresses
Singers from Tokyo
Voice actresses from Tokyo
21st-century Japanese actresses
21st-century Japanese musicians
21st-century women musicians
21st-century Japanese singers
21st-century Japanese women singers
Year of birth missing (living people)